Chin Shih-chieh (born 29 December 1951) is a Taiwanese actor, director and playwright.

By 1980, he was known as a director, leading the performances of Ho Chu’s New Match for Lanling. He directed the 2002 production of She is Walking, She is Smiling staged at the National Theatre in Taipei, by the Performance Workshop. He was cast in Art, a Gadot production, the next year alongside Ku Pao-ming and Lee Li-chun. In 2008, Chin starred in Othello alongside Lee. Performances were held throughout Taiwan, marking Godot's twentieth anniversary. As Othello's run stretched into January 2009, Chin remained on the cast. Chin directed Ho Chu’s New Match a second time in May 2009. In 2010, Chin appeared in The 39 Steps for Godot. This was the first production to be licensed in Chinese while still on an original run in New York and London. The next year, Chin took the stage in Tuesdays with Morrie, based on a memoir of the same name. The performance ran in Taipei and Taichung through March 2012. In 2013, Chin joined the cast of Stan Lai's A Dream Like A Dream.

Chin film roles include Cho Li's directorial debut,  (2010), and Lin Fu-ching's first film  (2012).

Selected filmography

Wo ta lang er lai (1978)
Liu chao guai tan (1979)
Ho Chu's New Match (1980, 2009)
You wo wu di (1980)
Xin hai shuang shi (1981)
Terrorizers (1986) - Zhou's lover
Soursweet (1988) - Night Brother
A Brighter Summer Day (1991) - Ming's 7th Uncle
Qi wang (1991) - Lanky Ngai
Secret Love for the Peach Blossom Spring (1993) - Chiang Pin-Liu
The Great Conqueror's Concubine (1994)
Tian Di (1994) - Shantung Cat
Island of Greed (1997) - Fai's Supervisor
The Personals (1998)
Guo jong (1999) - Mr. Liu
Born to Be King (2000)
She is Walking, She is Smiling (2002)
Art (2003)
The Rise of the Tang Empire (2006, TV Series) - Wei Zheng
Irma La Douce (2007)
Ting che (2008)
Dou cha (2008)
Othello (2008–2009, TV Series)
Black & White (2009, TV Series)
Empire of Silver (2009) - Manager Liu
Tai bei piao xue (2009) - Master Ma
 (2010) - Doorman
 (2010) - Chang
Reign of Assassins (2010) - Doctor Li
17th Exit (公視人生劇展—十七號出入口) (2010) - Yuesheng Du
Mang ren dian ying yuan (2010)
The 39 Steps (2010) - Grandfather
 (2011, TV Series) - Yang Lei
In Time with You (2011, TV Series) - Uncle Pai
Tuesdays with Morrie (2011-2012, TV Series)
 (2012) - Tian Bian
The Guillotines (2012) - Wan Jiang
A Dream Like A Dream (2013)
The Grandmaster (2013)
Soul (2013) - Messenger
Rock N' Road (2014, TV Series) - Ko Chung-Ming
Brotherhood of Blades (2014) - Wei Zhongxian
Black & White Episode I: The Dawn of Assault (2014) - Shih Yung-Kuang
Mr. Right Wanted (2015, TV Series) - Yu Wen
Double Date (2015)
Du yi wu er (2015)
The Last Women Standing (2015) - Sheng's Father
The Final Master (2015) - Zheng Shan'ao - The Grandmaster
Detective Chinatown (2015) - Mr. Yan
 (2015, Documentary) - Narrator (voice)
E ling zhi men (2016)
Big Fish & Begonia (2016) - Ling Po (voice)
Godspeed (2016) - Nadow's Father
See You Tomorrow (2016) - God of Bing
Ni hao, feng zi! (2016) - Nai'en Xiao
The Apparition (2016)
 (2016)
Provoking Laughter (2016)
The Rise of a Tomboy (2016)
Duckweed (2017) - Police director
Once Upon a Time in the Northeast (2017) - Jiang Dong
Surgeons (2017, TV Series) - Xiu Minqi
Brotherhood of Blades II: The Infernal Battlefield (2017) - Wei Zhongxian
Reset (2017) - Director
Princess Agents (2017, TV Series) - Yuwen Xi
Da Hu Fa (2017) - Ji'an
Le portrait interdit (2017) - General Intendent Chen
Inference Notes (2017) - Zhou
Midnight Diner (2017, TV Series)
Hua jia da ren zhuan nan hai (2018) - Mr. Fang
The Way of the Bug (2018) - Uncle Da
Great Expectations (2018, TV Series) - Huang Shang
Ren jian, xi ju (2019) - Yang Taijun
A Live Kidnap Show (2019)
Wo de qing chun dou shi ni (2019) - Professor Wang
Qi Huan Zhi Lv (2019)
San Cha Ji (2020)
Winter Begonia (2020)

References

External links

1951 births
Living people
Taiwanese male stage actors
Taiwanese male television actors
Taiwanese male film actors
Taiwanese theatre directors
20th-century Taiwanese male actors
21st-century Taiwanese male actors